Yang Shiyuan (born 11 March 1994 in Anshan) is a Chinese football player of Korean descent who currently plays for Chinese Super League side Shanghai Port.

Club career
Yang started his professional football career in 2011 when he was loaned to Shanghai Zobon's squad for the 2011 China League Two campaign.  He joined Chinese Super League side Shanghai Dongya in 2014. He made his Super League debut on 22 March 2014 in a game against Hangzhou Greentown, coming on as a substitute for Zhu Zhengrong in the 79th minute. He was sent off in his second appearance in a Shanghai Derby match against Shanghai Greenland Shenhua for a high tackle on Giovanni Moreno. He received a ban of 2 matches and was fined ¥10,000 on 30 April 2014. On 28 February 2017, Yang was loaned to fellow Super League side Yanbian Funde until 31 December 2017. Failed to established himself in the first team, he was degraded to reserve squad in June 2017.

Career statistics 
Statistics accurate as of match played 31 December 2022.

References

External links
 

1994 births
Living people
Chinese footballers
Sportspeople from Anshan
Footballers from Liaoning
Pudong Zobon players
Shanghai Port F.C. players
Yanbian Funde F.C. players
Suzhou Dongwu F.C. players
China League Two players
Chinese Super League players
Chinese people of Korean descent
Association football defenders